Pyrausta bouveti is a moth in the family Crambidae. It was described by Pierre Viette in 1981. It is found on the island of Grande Comore in the Comoros off the eastern coast of Africa.

References

Moths described in 1981
bouveti
Moths of Africa